Jason Romero (born February 27, 1995) is an American professional soccer player who plays as a forward for A-League club Macarthur FC.

Early Life
Romero was born in San Jose to Ignacio and Evangelina Romero where he grew up watching and playing soccer. He attended Evergreen Valley High School and played for the school's soccer team, becoming their leading goalscorer in 2011.

Club career

Youth Career
As a youth, Romero trained under the U.S. Soccer Development Academy. During his time at the academy, he played against professional clubs preferably academies teams of the MLS where he would frequently score against. In March 2013, he was called into the U.S. National Youth Camps after receiving player of the week in his previous match where he scored the game-winning goal. Due to his goalscoring talent, it earned him a trial at the Colorado Rapids and interest from top clubs in the United States and Mexico.

College Career

Pima College
Romero played in Arizona for Pima Community College. He was the top goalscorer for the college, breaking the record for most goals scored in a season and winning the ACCAC Division I Player of the Year.Additionally, he was named in the NJCAA All-American soccer team. The college finished third in the division and Romero left soon after to move back to California.

UCLA Bruins
On February 3, 2016, Romero moved to UCLA Bruins.

FC Tucson
On April 27, 2018, Romero signed with FC Tucson among 5 other new signings. Romero helped Tucson advance to the second round of the U.S. Open Cup scoring a goal in a 2-1 win over Máquina. Romero scored again in the second round but his side eventually lost 4-2 to Las Vegas Lights.

St George FC
Romero joined Australian club St George FC in 2018. He played in the NPL NSW 2 grand final where he scored a hattrick and eventually won the title on penalties against Mounties Wanderers.

Nyköpings BIS
On January 24, 2019, Romero signed with Swedish club Nyköpings BIS. On April 8, 2019, He made his league debut against Gefle. Romero was the clubs top goalscorer before departing mid-season, scoring 5 goals in the league and two goals in the Swedish Cup.

Umeå FC
On July 7, 2019, Romero signed with 1st Divison rivals Umeå on a 1 year deal. He made his club debut as substitute in a 2-1 win against Vasalunds, coming on in the 75th minute for Isaac Boye. On October 21, 2019, Romero scored his first goal for the club against Rynninge. On November 25, 2019, it was announced that Romero's contract was not to be extended and was allowed to leave the club as a free agent.

St George City
On March 4, 2020, Romero signed with St George City as a marquee player ahead of the 2020 season. During his two years at the club, Romero helped his club go top of the league for the first time since getting promoted but due to COVID-19 the season was cancelled and no title was given.

APIA Leichhardt
On September 25, 2021, Romero signed with APIA Leichhardt after his impressive form with St George City. He remained prolific during the 2022 season, scoring a hat-trick against former NSL giant Sydney Olympic and helped his side defeat A-League club Western Sydney Wanderers in a 2-1 upset in the FFA Cup. At the end of the season, Romero was announced in the league's Team of the Year with APIA teammate Themba Muata-Marlow.

Romero was announced to play in the 2023 NPL NSW season for APIA. He started the season scoring 4 goals against South Sydney club Rockdale Ilinden in a 6-0 home win.

Macarthur FC
On February 24, 2023, Romero signed with Macarthur FC as an injury replacement for star player Ulises Dávila who is recovering from a knee injury. Romero made his professional club debut on March 5, 2023, being substituted on, in a 3-2 league win against Brisbane Roar. A week after starting his first game for the club, on March 19 2023, he scored his first professional goal against Melbourne City at the 26th minute of the match.

Career statistics

Club

Honors
St George FC
NSW League One: 2018

Individual
ACCAC Player of the Year: 2015
NPL NSW Men Team of the Year: 2022

References

External links

1995 births
Living people
American soccer players
Association football forwards
A-League Men players
National Premier Leagues players
Ettan Fotboll players
USL League Two players
Macarthur FC players
APIA Leichhardt FC players
Nyköpings BIS players
Umeå FC players
FC Tucson players
 UCLA Bruins men's soccer players
American expatriate soccer players
Expatriate footballers in Sweden
Expatriate soccer players in Australia
Sportspeople from California
Soccer players from California
Sportspeople from San Jose, California
Soccer players from San Jose, California
People from San Jose, California